Prince Hyomok (Hangul: 효목태자, Hanja: 孝穆太子), personal name Wang Ui (Hangul: 왕의, Hanja: 王義), was a prince of Goryeo as the oldest son of Taejo of Goryeo and Lady Dongyangwon. He also was the older brother of Prince Hyoeun. Although his wife was not recorded, with this marriage, he had one son who later become a Korean Buddhist monk.

References

Korean princes
Year of birth unknown
Year of death unknown
10th-century Korean people